The 1987 All-SEC football team consists of American football players selected to the All-Southeastern Conference (SEC) chosen by various selectors for the 1987 college football season.

Offensive selections

Receivers
Lawyer Tillman, Auburn (AP-1)
Wendell Davis, LSU (AP-1)
J. R. Ambrose, Ole Miss (AP-2)
Carl Parker, Vanderbilt (AP-2)

Tight ends 
Walter Reeves, Auburn (AP-1)
Brian Kinchen, LSU (AP-2)

Tackles
Stacy Searels, Auburn (AP-1)
David Williams, Florida (AP-2)

Guards 
Eric Andolsek, LSU (AP-1)
Harry Galbreath, Tennessee (AP-1)
Kim Stephens, Georgia (AP-1)
Greg Kunkel, Kentucky (AP-2)
Bill Condon, Alabama (AP-2)
Dermontti Dawson, Kentucky (AP-2)

Centers 
Nacho Albergamo, LSU (AP-1)
Daryl Holt, Vanderbilt (AP-2)

Quarterbacks 

 Tommy Hodson, LSU (AP-1)
Jeff Burger, Auburn (AP-2)

Running backs 

 Bobby Humphrey, Alabama (AP-1)
Emmitt Smith, Florida (College Football Hall of Fame) (AP-1)
Mark Higgs, Kentucky (AP-2)
Lars Tate, Georgia (AP-2)
Reggie Cobb, Tennessee (AP-2)

Defensive selections

Ends
Aundray Bruce, Auburn (AP-1)
Clifford Charlton, Florida (AP-1)
Ron Sancho, LSU (AP-2)
Randy Rockwell, Alabama (AP-2)

Tackles 
Tracy Rocker, Auburn (AP-1)
Rhondy Weston, Florida (AP-1)
Nate Hill, Auburn (AP-2)
Jerry Reese, Kentucky (AP-2)

Middle guards
Willie Wyatt, Alabama (AP-2)

Linebackers 
 Kurt Crain, Auburn (AP-1)
John Brantley, Georgia (AP-1)
Chris Gaines, Vanderbilt (AP-1)
Derrick Thomas, Alabama (AP-1)
Jeff Harrod, Ole Miss (AP-2)
Kelly Ziegler, Tennessee (AP-2)
Keith DeLong, Tennessee (AP-2)

Backs 
Kevin Porter, Auburn (AP-1)
Louis Oliver, Florida (AP-1)
Terry McDaniel, Tennessee (AP-1)
Chris Carrier, LSU (AP-2)
Jarvis Williams, Florida (AP-2)
John Mangum, Alabama (AP-2)
Todd Sandroni, Ole Miss (AP-2)

Special teams

Kicker 
Win Lyle, Auburn (AP-1)
David Browndyke, LSU (AP-2)

Punter 

Matt DeFrank, LSU (AP-1)
Bob Garmon, Tennessee (AP-2)

Key
AP = Associated Press

UPI = United Press International

Bold = Consensus first-team selection by both AP and UPI

See also
1987 College Football All-America Team

References

All-SEC
All-SEC football teams